The Narrows is a strait in New York City separating Brooklyn and Staten Island.

The Narrows may also refer to:

Places

Antarctica
The Narrows (Antarctica), a strait

Australia
The Narrows, an isthmus providing the only land access to Queenscliff, Victoria
The Narrows (Victoria), a strait on Phillip Island (Victoria)
The Narrows, Northern Territory, a town
The Narrows (Queensland), a strait separating Curtis Island from the mainland of Queensland
The Narrows, Queensland, the associate locality in Gladstone Region, Queensland
The Narrows of the Swan River spanned by Narrows Bridge (Perth)

Canada
The Narrows, Halifax, a strait in Halifax Harbour, Nova Scotia; the Halifax Explosion occurred here in 1917
The Narrows, Manitoba, a community in Division No. 19, Manitoba
The Narrows, the entrance to the harbour at St. John's, Newfoundland.
The Narrows, a former rapid on the Columbia River in British Columbia, now submerged as a flatwater narrows between Upper and Lower Arrow Lakes
The Narrows, a small stretch of water on Fish Egg Inlet, a small inlet west of Rivers Inlet on the Central Coast of British Columbia
Informally, any number of marine locations in British Columbia, the most notable being Seymour Narrows, Skookumchuck Narrows, Cinnemouson Narrows and the First and Second Narrows of Burrard Inlet
The Narrows Locks, a lock station on the Rideau Canal, it was constructed to speed construction and reduce costs by raising the water supply roughly three feet while also flooding the swamps and lowland which had driven malaria outbreaks amongst the labourers. This split Rideau Lake into the Upper Rideau and Lower Rideau.

Caribbean
The Narrows (Saint Kitts and Nevis), the strait between the islands of Saint Kitts and Nevis

United States
The Narrows (Alaska), a channel in Southeast Alaska
The Narrows (Gunnison County, Colorado), a mountain pass in Gunnison County, Colorado, United States.
The Narrows (Las Animas County, Colorado), a mountain pass in Las Animas County, Colorado, United States.
The Narrows is the name of one leg of the original main entrance to Boston Harbor
The Narrows including Celilo Falls, part of a series of rapids upstream of The Dalles, Oregon
The Narrows (Knox County, Texas), a narrow ridge separating the watersheds of the Wichita River and Brazos River
The Narrows (Pennsylvania), a water gap where the Raystown Branch Juniata River passes through Evitts Mountain in Bedford County, Pennsylvania
Informally, the Tacoma Narrows in Pierce County, Washington
The Narrows (Zion National Park), along the North Fork Virgin River in Zion National Park, Utah
Informally, the Cumberland Narrows, a water gap located northwest of Cumberland, Maryland, where Wills Creek cuts through Haystack and Wills Mountain
Informally, the Kent Narrows in Queen Anne's County, Maryland

Other uses
The Narrows (Connelly novel), a 2004 Bosch novel by Michael Connelly
The Narrows (Malfi novel), a 2012 novel by Ronald Malfi
The Narrows (Petry novel), a 1953 novel by Ann Petry
The Narrows (film), a 2008 American film
The Narrows, a fictional neighbourhood in Gotham City in the Batman stories

See also
Narrows (disambiguation)
Narrow (disambiguation)
Narro (disambiguation)